Adrian Grant (born 6 October 1980 in London, United Kingdom) is a professional squash player from England. He reached a career-high world ranking of World No. 9 in August 2009.

Grant finished as the runner-up at the British National Squash Championships in 2009 (losing in the final to Nick Matthew).

References

External links 
 
 
 

1980 births
Living people
English male squash players
Sportspeople from London
Squash players at the 2006 Commonwealth Games
Squash players at the 2010 Commonwealth Games
Commonwealth Games gold medallists for England
Commonwealth Games silver medallists for England
Squash players at the 2014 Commonwealth Games
Commonwealth Games medallists in squash
Medallists at the 2010 Commonwealth Games
Medallists at the 2014 Commonwealth Games